East Fork Township (T8+N⅔T7N R3W) is located in Montgomery County, Illinois, United States. As of the 2010 census, its population was 2,566 and it contained 1,093 housing units.

Adjacent townships
 Irving Township (north)
 Witt Township (northeast)
 Fillmore Township (east)
 South Fillmore Township (east)
 Mulberry Grove Township, Bond County (southeast)
 La Grange Township, Bond County (south)
 Shoal Creek Township, Bond County (southwest)
 Grisham Township (west)
 Hillsboro Township (west)
 Butler Grove Township (northwest)

Geography

Demographics

References

External links
City-data.com
Illinois State Archives
Historical Society of Montgomery County

Townships in Montgomery County, Illinois
1872 establishments in Illinois
Townships in Illinois